The Basalt Cobblestone Quarries District, in Clark County, Washington near Ridgefield, is a  area which was listed on the National Register of Historic Places in 1981.  It included seven contributing sites: seven separate quarries.

It is located in the Carty Unit of the Ridgefield National Wildlife Refuge.

References

Quarries in the United States
National Register of Historic Places in Clark County, Washington